Forever My Girl is a 2018 American romantic drama film written and directed by Bethany Ashton Wolf based on the novel by Heidi McLaughlin. It follows a country musician (Alex Roe) who sets out to win over the girl he left at the altar eight years before (Jessica Rothe). Abby Ryder Fortson, Travis Tritt, and John Benjamin Hickey also star.

The film was released in the United States on January 19, 2018. It received negative reviews from critics, who denounced the writing and chemistry between the actors, and compared it negatively to Nicholas Sparks films. However, audience reception was more positive, and the film was a modest box office success grossing $16 million on a $3.5 million budget.

Plot
In Saint Augustine, Louisiana, Josie is left at the altar by her fiancé Liam to pursue fame and fortune. Eight years later, Liam is a successful country singer. The day after a concert in New Orleans, Liam, after a one night stand wakes up to discover the girl he slept with jumping excitedly, unaware she is on his beat up cell phone. Panicked, Liam takes the phone to a store where the manager fixes the phone for Liam. Afterwards, his manager questions why he still has the phone, Liam revealing it has a very important message on it. While watching TV, Liam learns that Mason, one of his groomsmen from the wedding and his best friend from childhood, has been killed in a car accident.
Liam returns to St. Augustine and attends Mason's funeral. Although Liam attempts to be discreet, Josie recognizes him. After Mason's burial, Josie approaches Liam and punches him in the stomach.

Liam stays with his father, Pastor Brian, although his father is bitter that Liam never kept in contact after becoming famous. While becoming reacquainted with the town, Liam encounters Josie at a flower shop she owns. Liam learns that Josie has a seven-year old daughter, Billy, and that he is the father. Josie confesses that she found out she was pregnant two weeks after he left her at the altar. Although Josie tried to contact him, Liam never returned her call, and Josie decided that if Liam didn't care enough to call her back to find out what was so important, then she wasn't going to contact him again because she and Billy deserve better. He is also surprised to learn that his father also tried to tell him that Josie was pregnant with their daughter at one of his concerts seven years ago, but Liam was so absorbed in his fame that he rudely dismissed his father and didn’t listen to him. Liam eventually persuades Josie to let him spend time with Billy, albeit on Josie's terms. Billy quickly realizes Liam is her father, much to Josie's surprise, and supports Liam's idea.

Liam and Billy bond, with Billy displaying her father's musical ability. Josie even agrees to let Billy stay the night with Liam. As Liam tucks her in, Billy asks him why he left Josie, and Liam admits he was young and confused, although he regrets his decision, Josie and Brian overhear the conversation. After Billy falls asleep, Josie asks Liam on a date. Liam flies Josie to New Orleans for their date, although they are stopped by the press. Liam publicly announces his love for Josie, calling her "The One".

After returning to Saint Augustine, Liam and Billy continue to bond. Billy chokes on her lunch, but Liam is frozen after having a flashback to his mother’s death. Jake, Josie’s brother, saves Billy. Distraught at his inability to act, Liam gets drunk at a bar. Jake visits Liam and tells him that Josie and Billy would be better off without him. While bandaging Liam’s wound that night from punching a mirror, Brian reveals to Liam that when his mother died, he was so absorbed in his own grief that he overlooked Liam’s and apologizes to him for it.  He tells Liam that he thinks being famous and never contacting him was a way for him to deal with the grief of his mother’s death, to which Liam agrees. Liam leaves the next morning without telling Josie or Billy, leaving a note for his Dad telling him that Billy and Josie are better off without him.

Liam returns to his tour and performs in London. However, his manager Sam inspires him to return to his family. At the airport, Liam responds to the message on the answering machine that Josie left for him 8 years earlier, explaining that losing his mother caused him to fear losing her, causing him to flee. Liam returns to Saint Augustine and meets with Josie. Liam and Josie get married and Liam plays a song on stage with Billy, first at the child's school talent show, and then during his musical tour in Berlin.

Cast
Alex Roe as Liam Lincoln Page
Jessica Rothe as Josie Mollee Swan
Abby Ryder Fortson as Billy Anne Swan
Travis Tritt as Walt
Peter Cambor as Sam, Liam's manager
Gillian Vigman as Doris, a publicist
Judith Hoag as Dr. Whitman
Tyler Riggs as Jake Swan
John Benjamin Hickey as Pastor Brian Page

Production

Development 
Author Heidi McLaughlin was inspired to write  Forever My Girl  after seeing a picture of a man on Facebook who looked like he was trying to apologize to a girl. To choose the name of Liam Page it took her a total of 10 or 15 minutes, and that same night she wrote the first 5,000 words. After her book was published, she received an offer from LD Entertainment for a film based on the book. On adapting the book for film, Roe said, "It was difficult to accommodate everything in an hour and a half obviously and there were also other changes that Bethany [Wolf] thought were important."

Casting 
McLaughlin said that writing for Liam and Josie was easy because she has friends who are in bands. For the role of Liam, Roe had to learn to sing and play the guitar. Brett Boyett, the film's musical supervisor, helped him practice every day for almost three months. To research his accent Roe watched interviews of country music singers. He was nervous about acting on stage and talked to country group Little Big Town about performing in front of 50,000 people. Roe formed a band in Los Angeles and held several performances for close friends to practice. McLaughlin positively compared Roe to actor Stephen Amell, stating that, "Alex Roe looks like Amell but younger, so for me it's a perfect choice."
Rothe said she was attracted to the role of Josie for her strength and female empowerment. McLaughlin originally pictured the Australian supermodel Miranda Kerr for the role, and remarked that Rothe resembled a blonde version of Kerr.
Rothe and Roe did not know each other beforehand but had several friends in common, and hung out several times before filming in Atlanta to feel comfortable around each other.

Reception

Box office 
Forever My Girl opened on January 19, 2018, and grossed $4.7 million from 1,115 theaters in its opening weekend, finishing 10th. It held well in its second weekend, dropping just 12% to $3.7 million. The film went on to make a total of $16.4 million, against a production budget of $3.5 million.

Critical response
The website's critical consensus reads, "Forever My Girl offers a suitably picturesque placeholder for romance fans between Nicholas Sparks films, but other viewers may end up crying for the wrong reasons." On Metacritic, the film has a weighted average score of 36 out of 100, based on 18 critics, indicating "generally unfavorable reviews". Audiences polled by CinemaScore gave the film an average grade of "A" on an A+ to F scale.

Home media
The film was released on DVD and Blu-ray on April 24, 2018.

References

External links
 

2018 films
American romantic drama films
Films set in Louisiana
2018 romantic drama films
Films based on American novels
Country music films
2010s English-language films
2010s American films